MorphThing is a website that allows users to morph uploaded photos together, transitioning gradually from one to the other. Members could upload photos and submit them to the site, with approval, for everyone to use. If members are registered then they can save morphed images and upload new ones. MorphThing also has a large selection of already morphed images.

Upload

MorphThing allows registered members to upload images for private or public use (public uses with approval). Once images have uploaded, they must be "prepared" before being morphed.

Preparing
In order to prepare, there are green dots (control pins). First, there are 6 green dots, these are placed in important areas of the eyebrows. Next comes more dots, only this time they are used for placement in the eyes, then the nose, lips, hairline, & jaw. Placement of these dots are extremely important for proper morphing.

Morphing
In order to morph the user look through the library of photos and select up to four images, then click morph. Then, the image will morph. This usually takes about 1–5 seconds. What one can also do is now morph their recently morphed image with other images, simply by clicking "Morph this Image". Clicking that will redirect the user back to the library; only their recently morphed image will now be in the user's selected images. About 550 images are currently available for morphing.

What will my baby look like?

In early June, 2009, MorphThing added a baby application. This allows users to upload photos of themselves and someone else (privately) and instead of morphing one can easily create a MorphBaby. This will morph the two images and will also add a baby that best suits the photos to the morph. This makes for a very realistic baby morph. Members can also select a photo of themselves (privately) and a celebrity to make a MorphBaby. Only two photos are able to be used for MorphBabies, regardless of gender.

Popularity
As of September 2, 2007, over 1,000,000 morphs had been created using MorphThing. MorphThing is most popular in the United States, Germany, India, Canada & the United Kingdom.

Specialty Apps

On May 27, 2009, MorphThing introduced the MorphThing Facebook App.

References

External links

Photo software
Software companies based in California
Technology companies based in Greater Los Angeles
Companies based in Los Angeles
Westchester, Los Angeles
American companies established in 2007
Software companies established in 2007
2007 establishments in California
Software companies of the United States